Hualong Hui Autonomous County is a county in the east of Qinghai Province, China. It is under the administration of Haidong City. Its area is 2,790 square kilometers and has a population of 203,317 in 2010.

Administrative divisions

Towns 
 Bayan, Qunke (ཚའཱི་མགུར་, 群科镇), Yashiga (ཡར་ག་, 牙什尕镇), Gandu (ཀ་མདོ་, 甘都镇), Zhaba (རྩ་བ་, 扎巴镇), Angsiduo (ནང་སྟོད་, 昂思多镇)

Townships 
 Chuma Township (ཆུ་དམར་, 初麻乡), Ertang Township, Xiejiatan Township, Dehenglong Township (སྟག་ལུང་, 德恒隆乡), Shalianbao Township, Ashennu Township (ཨ་སྔོན་, 阿什奴乡), Shidacang Township (སྟག་ཚང་, 石大仓乡)

Ethnic Townships 
 Shongshen Tibetan Ethnic Township (གཤོང་ཤན་, 雄先藏族乡), Tsaphug Tibetan Ethnic Township (ཚ་ཕུག་, 查甫藏族乡), Thagya Tibetan Ethnic Township (ཐ་རྒྱ་, 塔加藏族乡), Serzhong Tibetan Ethnic Township (གསེར་གཞོང་, 金源藏族乡)

Climate

See also
 List of administrative divisions of Qinghai

References

External links

County-level divisions of Qinghai
Haidong
Hui autonomous counties